Feliniopsis opposita is a moth of the family Noctuidae first described by Francis Walker in 1865. It is found in Kenya, Somalia, Sri Lanka and India.

References

Moths of Asia
Moths described in 1865
Hadeninae